Pierre Sophal Tonlop (born 1953) is a Cambodian Roman Catholic priest best known as the first native of Cambodia to be ordained a priest after the fall of the Khmer Rouge in 1979; he was ordained on 22 July 1995 and assigned to the Apostolic Prefecture of Battambang.

Tonlop was a resident of Canada from 1984 to 1990, during which he studied at the Grand Séminaire de Montréal (Major Seminary of Montreal). From 1990 to 1993, he continued his studies in France. By 1994, after his ordination as a deacon, he volunteered to become a missionary in Cambodia for a return to his native country, where he later became a priest the year after.

As of 2012, he is Battambang's Vicar Delegate in charge of caring for Vietnamese Catholic communities in the country, alongside heading the Rice Bank of the Church.

See also
Dominique Nget Viney, one of the next four native Cambodians to become a priest in 2001 after Tonlop

References

1953 births
Living people
20th-century Roman Catholic priests
21st-century Roman Catholic priests
Cambodian expatriates
Cambodian Roman Catholics
People from Phnom Penh